One Day Savior Recordings was an American independent record label founded in 1997 by Christopher Tzompanakis. The record label was most prominent in the hardcore and indie rock communities, releasing metalcore, post-hardcore and emo by such bands as Boys Night Out, Dearly Departed, Embodyment, Hopesfall, The Juliana Theory, The Killing Tree, The Movielife, Onelinedrawing, Paulson, Skycamefalling, The Sleeping and Tabula Rasa. One Day Savior Recordings was originally headquartered in Williston Park, Long Island, New York, where it remained until it was put under hiatus in 2008. The company was eventually sold to Tommy Melissen in 2010, its operations relocating to Philadelphia, Pennsylvania. Under Melissen's ownership, the company lasted a brief two years and was officially put to rest in 2014 after two years of inactivity. 

One Day Savior Recordings was distributed by Lumberjack Mordam Music Group, and at times co-released albums with Ferret Music, Eulogy Recordings, Trustkill Records, Defiance Records, Solid State Records, Initial Records, Doghouse Records, Black Box Music, Cavity Records, Immigrant Sun Records, Forge Again Records, Scorched Earth Policy, and Scene Police Records.

Background 
One Day Savior Recordings (also known as One Day Savior Record Company or One Day Savior Records, and stylized as OneDaySavior) was founded by Skycamefalling vocalist Christopher Tzompanakis in 1997. Tzompanakis was shopping around for a new record label for his band when, after hearing negative feedback from his friends' bands about local record labels, decided to start up his own. However, Tzompanakis made it a point not to affiliate his record label with his band and treated them as separate businesses.

Acquisition 
On July 31, 2010, after 26 months of inactivity, One Day Savior Recordings' website announced that it was under the new ownership of Tommy Melissen and had relocated to Philadelphia, Pennsylvania. Some of the bands signed to One Day Savior Recordings by Melissen include Animalhaüs, American Hell, Holly Would..., Me Against Myself, The Jett Black Hearts Attacks and XPunisHerX.

One Day Savior Fest 
Tzompanakis organized a one-day festival named One Day Savior Fest which took place on October 19, 2002 at the Bricklayers and Allied Craftworkers Union Local 7 in Farmingdale, New York. The artists that performed included The Killing Tree, Boys Night Out, Tabula Rasa, Dearly Departed, Blood Red, Regarding I, In Dying Days, Kid Brother Collective and The Chase Theory.

Artists 
This is an archival list of artists who have recorded for One Day Savior Recordings.

 Animalhaüs
 American Hell
 Bird of Ill Omen
 Blue Skies Burning
 Boys Night Out
 Break of Dawn
 Celebrity
 The Chase Theory
 Confine
 Day After
 Dearly Departed
 Embodyment
 Ex Number Five
 Forstella Ford
 The Grey A.M.
 Holly Would...
 Hopesfall
 Ignorance Never Settles
 In Dying Days
 Incision
 The Jett Blackk Heart Attacks
 Jude The Obscure
 The Juliana Theory
 Kid Brother Collective
 The Killing Tree
 Knives & Green Water
 Mara'akate
 Me Against Myself
 The Movielife
 Onelinedrawing
 Paulson
 XPunisHerX
 Regarding I
 Remembering Never
 Rosesdead
 Serapis
 Skycamefalling
 The Sleeping
 Suicide Note
 Superstitions of the Sky
 Tabula Rasa
 Take My Chances
 Undying

See also 
 List of record labels

References

External links
  
 
 

1997 establishments in New York (state)
2014 disestablishments in Pennsylvania
American independent record labels
American record labels
Companies based in Nassau County, New York
Companies based in New York (state)
Companies based in Philadelphia
Defunct companies based in New York (state)
Defunct companies based in Pennsylvania
Defunct record labels of the United States
Entertainment companies based in New York (state)
Hardcore record labels
Heavy metal record labels
Indie rock record labels
New York (state) record labels
Post-hardcore record labels
Record labels disestablished in 2014
Record labels established in 1997
Rock record labels